Bodysurfer is a 1989 Australian mini series about a Sydney architect having a mid life crisis.

Cast

 Peter Kowitz - David Lang
 Melissa Marshall - Helen Lang
 Joy Smithers - Lydia
 Linda Cropper - Anthea
 Patrick Ward - Parnell
 Penne Hackforth-Jones - Angela
 Abigail - Mrs. James
 Tim Robertson - Rex Lang
 Anthony Brandon Wong - Dr. Wu

Music

 Martin Armiger - composer
 Derek Williams - orchestrator, conductor

References

External links
 Bodysurfer at Screen Australia
 IMDb

1990s Australian television miniseries
English-language television shows